Palacio de los Deportes de Torrevieja is an arena in Torrevieja, Spain.  It is primarily used for team handball and is the home arena of CB Torrevieja. The arena holds 4,500 people.

External links
 Torrevieja city video. From a local resident.

Handball venues in Spain
Indoor arenas in Spain
Sports venues in the Valencian Community